Akhund (akhoond, akhwand, akhand or konde) is a Persian title or surname for Islamic scholars, common in Iran, Afghanistan, Tajikistan, Pakistan, Bangladesh, and Azerbaijan. Other names for similar Muslim Scholar include sheikh and mullah.

The Standard Chinese word for imam, used in particular by the Hui people, also derives from this term.

Duty
Akhunds are religious and spiritual leaders. They lead the prayers in the mosques, deliver religious sermons, perform religious ceremonies such as milad, marriage rituals, birth rituals etc. Many of them were magistrates or justices of Sharia courts who also exercised extrajudicial functions, such as mediation, guardianship over orphans and minors, and supervision and auditing of public works. They also often teach in Islamic schools known in Iran as hawzas and in other countries as madrasas.

Akhunds will usually have completed higher studies on Islamic subjects such as Sharia, Fiqh (Islamic jurisprudence), Quran etc. They commonly dress in religious attire.

Old usage
This term was traditionally a slang term in Iran, and it has been completely a derogatory term since the Pahlavi era. In Iran, they are also called mullah, molavi, sheikh, haj-agha, or ruhani. The word ruhani means "spiritual, holy". Ruhani is considered a more polite term for Muslim clerics, used by Iranian national television and radio and by devout Muslim families. Akhund is increasingly outmoded in Iran, usually with only the older clerics having the title as part of their name. It has not been used widely as a title since the Qajar dynasty.

In Afghanistan, and among the Pashtuns of the Afghan-Pakistan border region, the term is still current in its original sense as an honorific.

Use in personal names 
The Azerbaijani surname Akhundov (as in e.g. Mirza Fatali Akhundov) is formed from the word akhund.

The Bangladeshi surname Akondo/Akand (আকন্দ), or Akhond/Akhand (আখন্দ) (as in e.g., Joulehertz Akondo, Lucky Akhand, Happy Akhand) is formed from the word Akhund.

Zeeshan Akhwand Khattak also uses this title with their personal name. Zeeshan Akhwand is a journalist and social worker from Karak, Pakistan.

See also   
 Akhund Abdul Ghaffur
 Clericalism in Iran
 Guardianship of the Islamic Jurists
 Kyai, similar term in Indonesia
 Ulama

Notes

Further reading

External links 
 

Islamic honorifics
Islamic Persian honorifics
Religious leadership roles
Titles in Afghanistan
Titles in Azerbaijan
Titles in Iran
Titles in Pakistan